493rd may refer to:

493d Bombardment Group, inactive United States Army Air Force unit
493d Bombardment Squadron or 93d Air Refueling Squadron (93 ARS), part of the 92d Air Refueling Wing at Fairchild Air Force Base, Washington
493d Fighter Squadron (493 FS), nicknamed "The Grim Reapers", part of the 48th Fighter Wing at RAF Lakenheath, England

See also
493 (number)
493, the year 493 (CDXCIII) of the Julian calendar
493 BC